Alien Syndrome is a video game by Totally Games, part of the Alien Syndrome franchise created by Sega. It was released for the PlayStation Portable and Wii in 2007. This iteration takes place a century after the previous game and introduces role-playing elements to the gameplay.

Plot
The story picks up approximately 100 years after the original Alien Syndrome. The title is set in the far future, where interplanetary space travel is possible. Communication is lost with one of the stations on a distant planet, the Kronos, and Aileen Harding is sent to investigate. She quickly discovers that Alien Syndrome is behind the disappearance and decides to fight the enemy and find out what happened to her boyfriend Tom.

Gameplay
Alien Syndrome is played as a top-down shooter, with players turning their characters the direction they would like to shoot. The game has 40 levels, with 5 bosses and 15 mini-bosses. Players customize their character to expand in-game strategy options.

Alien Syndrome offers up to 80 different weapons to use and hundreds of armor types as well as bonus items. Players are accompanied by a robotic drone (SCARAB) that serves as a storage space for items as well as a backup for the main character. As a constant companion, SCARAB can assist in fights and grant on-demand access to the character's cache of weapons and armors. Players have both a life meter and a constantly refilling energy meter, with the latter reflecting shield power.

The game also features co-op multiplayer for up to 4 people on one screen for the Wii version. On the PSP version, the game features co-op multiplayer via a WiFi connection.

On the PSP, player movement and aiming are handled with the analog stick; while a player is firing a ranged weapon, her facing is locked. On the Wii, movement is handled by the analog stick on the Nunchuk, while aiming is controlled by pointing with the Wii Remote.

The Wii version of Alien Syndrome differs very slightly as it emphasizes use of the Wiimote control scheme. Tilting the Nunchuk rotates the screen to change orientation. In addition, motion control-based minigames are available to the player to increase stats via DNA augmentation chambers found in various levels, defeat lock protection on golden chests with guided nanites to procure items with a variety of attributes as well as loot, and disinfect rare items afflicted by the Alien Syndrome with charged nanites to restore their attributes.

Reception

On the Wii, critical reception to this game was mostly negative. Both IGN and GameSpot praised the intuitive aiming controls, but complained about the lack of enemy variety and graphical difference between the Wii and PSP versions. Metacritic gave the Wii version of the game a rating of 48/100. The PSP version was given a 51/100 rating.

References

External links
Alien Syndrome at Sega of America
Alien Syndrome (PSP) at GameRankings
Alien Syndrome (Wii) at GameRankings
http://www.ign.com/articles/2007/07/26/alien-syndrome-review-2
http://www.gamespot.com/reviews/alien-syndrome-review/1900-6175780/

2007 video games
Cooperative video games
Multidirectional shooters
PlayStation Portable games
Sega video games
Vicious Engine games
Video game sequels
Video games about extraterrestrial life
Video games developed in the United States
Video games featuring female protagonists
Video games scored by Jared Emerson-Johnson
Wii games
Multiplayer and single-player video games
Cancelled PlayStation 3 games
Totally Games games